Thelecythara floridana is a species of sea snail, a marine gastropod mollusk in the family Pseudomelatomidae, the turrids and allies.

Williams stated in 2005 that Thelecythara borroi Sarasua, 1975 was a synonym of this species

Description
The length of the shell attains 9 mm.

Distribution
T. floridana can be found in the Gulf of Mexico, ranging from the coast of Texas south to Venezuela, as well as the eastern Pacific Ocean.

References

 Gibson-Smith, J., and W. Gibson-Smith. "New recent gastropod species from Venezuela and a bivalve range extension." Veliger 25.3 (1983): 177
 Sarasúa, H. "Nuevos género, subgénero y especies de moluscos marinos neogastrópodos." Poeyana 140 (1975): 1–15.
 Espinosa J., Ortea J. & Diez García Y. (2017). Nuevas especies y nuevos registros de moluscos gasterópodos (Mollusca: Gastropoda) marinos de la región oriental de Cuba. Avicennia. 21: 59–67

External links
 Rosenberg G., Moretzsohn F. & García E. F. (2009). Gastropoda (Mollusca) of the Gulf of Mexico, Pp. 579–699 in Felder, D.L. and D.K. Camp (eds.), Gulf of Mexico–Origins, Waters, and Biota. Biodiversity. Texas A&M Press, College Station, Texas
  Tucker, J.K. 2004 Catalog of recent and fossil turrids (Mollusca: Gastropoda). Zootaxa 682:1–1295.
 

floridana
Gastropods described in 1953